The Men's 3,000 metres Steeplechase event at the 2003 Pan American Games took place on Sunday August 10, 2006. Venezuelan Néstor Nieves defeated title holder Joël Bourgeois from Canada.

Medalists

Records

Results

See also
2003 World Championships in Athletics – Men's 3000 metres steeplechase
Athletics at the 2004 Summer Olympics – Men's 3000 metre steeplechase

References
Results

Steeple, Men's
2003